Capoeta mauricii, also known as the longsnout scraper, is a cyprinid fish endemic the Lake Beyşehir drainage in Turkey.

References 

mauricii
Fish described in 2009